The 2. Frauen-Bundesliga is the second league competition for women's association football in Germany. For its first 14 seasons the league was divided into two groups: Nord and Süd. The winner and the runner-up are promoted to the Bundesliga (unless they are reserve teams of Bundesliga sides); the last three places are relegated to the Regionalliga. Until the 2017–18 season, in each group, the winner was promoted and the bottom two were relegated.

The league has been played as one group of 14 teams since the 2018–19 season, with second teams of clubs being ineligible for promotion and allowed to have only three players older than 20 years.

For the 2020–21 season only, the 2. Frauen-Bundesliga was divided into two groups of 10 and nine teams each due to the relegation being suspended for the 2019–20 season as a result of COVID-19 pandemic. The two group winners were promoted to the Frauen-Bundesliga for the 2021–22 season. From the 2021–22 season, a single group was used again.

Clubs
Members for the 2022–23 2. Frauen-Bundesliga.

Champions

Top scorers

Nord
 2004–05: Anja Koser (FFC Brauweiler Pulheim) – 27 goals
 2005–06: Martina Müller (VfL Wolfsburg) – 36 goals
 2006–07: Jennifer Ninaus (SG Wattenscheid 09) – 19 goals
 2007–08: Marie Pollmann (Herforder SV – 21 goals
 2008–09: Kerstin Straka (Tennis Borussia Berlin) &  Martina Fennen (SV Victoria Gersten) – 12 goals
 2009–10: Kathrin Patzke (Hamburger SV) – 25 goals
 2010–11: Kathrin Patzke (Hamburger SV) – 21 goals
 2011–12: Agnieszka Winczo (BV Cloppenburg) – 24 goals
 2012–13: Anna Laue (Herforder SV) – 22 goals
 2013–14: Cindy König (Werder Bremen) – 17 goals
 2014–15: Cindy König (Werder Bremen) – 19 goals
 2015–16: Giustina Ronzetti (Herforder SV) – 23 goals
 2016–17: Agnieszka Winczo (BV Cloppenburg) – 25 goals
 2017–18: Sarah Grünheid (Arminia Bielefeld) – 16 goals
 2020–21: Sarah Abu-Sabbah (Borussia Mönchengladbach) – 11 goals

Süd
 2004–05: Christina Arend (1. FC Saarbrücken) – 25 goals
 2005–06: Nadine Keßler (1. FC Saarbrücken) – 24 goals
 2006–07: Nadine Keßler (1. FC Saarbrücken) – 27 goals
 2007–08: Sabrina Schmutzler (FF USV Jena) – 27 goals
 2008–09: Jennifer Ninaus (SG Wattenscheid 09) – 20 goals
 2009–10: Bilgin Defterli (1. FC Köln) – 22 goals
 2010–11: Susanne Hartel (TSG 1899 Hoffenheim) – 16 goals
 2011–12: Natalia Mann (VfL Sindelfingen) & Claudia Nußelt (TSV Crailsheim) – 16 goals
 2012–13: Julia Manger (ETSV Würzburg) – 24 goals
 2013–14: Ilaria Mauro (SC Sand) & Sarah Schatton (1. FC Saarbrücken) – 24 goals
 2014–15: Lise Munk (1. FC Köln) – 27 goals
 2015–16: Nadja Pfeiffer (Borussia Mönchengladbach) – 16 goals 
 2016–17: Annika Eberhard (TSG 1899 Hoffenheim II) – 18 goals
 2017–18: Jana Beuschlein (TSG 1899 Hoffenheim) & Jacqueline de Becker (1. FC Saarbrücken) – 18 goals
 2020–21: Vanessa Leimenstoll (TSG 1899 Hoffenheim II) – 14 goals

One group
 2018–19: Julia Matuschewski (1. FC Saarbrücken) – 20 goals
 2019–20: Laura Lindner (Turbine Potsdam II) – 16 goals
 2021–22: Nastassja Lein (1. FC Nürnberg) / Ramona Maier (FC Ingolstadt) – 25 goals

References

External links
German Football Association (DFB) section on 2nd Women's Bundesliga

 
Women's football leagues in Germany